Naser Maleknia (in Persian: ناصر ملك نيا; died 15 June 2007) was a pioneering Iranian clinical biochemist and a distinguished professor of Tehran University.

Maleknia studied chemical engineering and principles of medicine in the USA then moved to France where he studied medicine and take PHD degree in biochemistry and  started research activities on clinical biochemistry. He became a full professor of Biochemistry and a director of the department of Biochemistry at Tehran University.

Maleknia was an inspiring and dedicated teacher of biochemistry who trained several generations of Iranian physicians.

Professor Maleknia died on 15 June 2007 in Tehran.

See also
Intellectual movements in Iran

References

bioiran.org

External links 
Naser Maleknia's publications in pubmed
Naser Maleknia in IranScienceIsland
The National biochimi & biotechnology Research Institute of IRAN

Academic staff of the University of Tehran
Academic staff of the Islamic Azad University
Iranian biochemists
2007 deaths
Year of birth missing